Hemideina ricta, known as the Banks Peninsula tree weta, is an insect that is found in New Zealand.

It is a tree weta that belongs to the order Orthoptera, which was described by Frederick Hutton in 1896. The word "weta" is originally from the Māori language, where it can be used as singular and plural.

Identification 
The Banks Peninsula tree weta is a red-brown colour (Biodiversity Recovery Unit, 1998) its body length can range from 40–55 mm in mature adults and it weighs 4–6 g. Like other insects Banks Peninsula tree weta has three body segments, a head, a thorax and an abdomen. Hemideina ricta and Hemideina femorata both live in forest fragments on Banks Peninsula. These two species can be differentiated using the number of stridulatory ridges on their abdomen.  Hemideina ricta has more than 20 ridges in total (left + right side of body) where as H. femorata has fewer than 16 stridulatory ridges. Although these two species will share the same daytime refuge holes only a few F1 hybrids have been found, and no gene flow has been detected between the two species.

The head of the mature male Banks Peninsula tree weta is much larger and darker than that of females or juvenile males with large mandibles that they use to fight other males. The two eyes are situated on the front of its head with two antennae protruding from the inside margin of these. The antennae can be much longer than the body length, and these are covered with hairs which are able to sense activity. Banks Peninsula tree weta also has three ocelli, or simple eyes, between its eyes which respond to changes in light.

The thorax contains the front, middle and hind legs of the weta, each leg is made up of six segments; the coxa, the trochanter, the femur, the tibia, the tarsus and the pretarsus. The ear of the weta can be found at the top of the tibia near the knee joint of the front legs. The tibia of the hind legs are covered in spines, that can be rubbed against the stridulatory ridges on the side of the body to produce a sound, these can also be used as a defence mechanism against predators. Banks Peninsula tree weta can be distinguished from other types of weta as they have 20 or more stridulatory ridges. The hind legs are also very muscular for the purpose of jumping, however the Banks Peninsula tree weta is too heavy to jump.

The abdomen is broken up into segments, called spiracles, and it is here we find the stridulatory ridges. Protruding from the abdomen is the cerci, which is used to pick up vibrations in the air. Females also have an ovipositor, a long tube like cylinder used to deposit eggs in the soil.

Geographic distribution and habitat

Global range 
The Banks Peninsula tree weta is native and endemic to New Zealand. Related species can be found in Australia, where they are known as king crickets, New Caledonia, Chile, Madagascar and South Africa.

New Zealand range 
The Banks Peninsula tree weta is found only on the east side of the Banks Peninsula. Its range is limited to a roughly 200 km² area between Pigeon Bay and Akaroa Harbour.

Habitat preference 
Due to the clearance of forest and shrubland on Banks Peninsula to make way for farming (Biodiversity Recovery Unit, 1998) Banks Peninsula tree weta spends a lot of its time living on the ground , it can often be found living on wooden posts, in crevices in rocks or in fallen tree logs. Where available the Banks Peninsula tree weta prefers to live in cavities of trees but where these are in short supply it makes do with its surroundings. When occupying trees Banks Peninsula tree weta is most often found in lacebark and kanuka trees however it has also been known to occupy broadleaf, mahoe and five finger amongst other species. When choosing a tree cavity to live in the Banks Peninsula tree weta prefers cavities that have a small opening, so that mammalian predators are unable to enter, and a large space inside. Tree weta generally do not dig their own cavities, they occupy ones previously made by the larvae of other insects. There can be several weta living in a single cavity at any one time, often a single male with several females. A male chooses and modifies a cavity so that the opening is just wide enough for its head to fit through. The Banks Peninsula tree weta is generally found at elevations above 400 metres and can be found at elevations of up to 800 metres.

Life cycle 
In captivity mating has been reported during the months of April, May and November. Mating generally occurs within cavities at night, as this is where large groups of females gather to seek out shelter. Adult males fight over ownership of cavities and therefore the females within those cavities, males with larger mandible gapes often come out on top in these battles.

After mating the female needs to leave the safety of the tree cavity in order to descend to the ground to lay her eggs. Oviposition, the process of egg laying, typically takes place at night. The female first examines the ground before laying her eggs by placing her ovipositor into it, she then moves on to a nearby patch of land and repeats this process laying more eggs. This procedure takes around 10–15 minutes. The eggs are around 5.9 mm in length, weigh around 16.8 mg and are black, brown or white in color. The eggs can take several months to mature , generally hatching during spring.

When eggs hatch they often do not do so all at once, a single batch of eggs may take up to two weeks to all hatch. A female weta can lay up to 200 eggs in her lifetime. It can take up to two years for juvenile weta to mature and reach adulthood, during this time the young weta must moult several times as it grows. It does this by anchoring itself to a tree branch using its hind legs and hanging upside down. The thorax is the first part of the body to emerge, followed by the abdomen, then the head, next the front and hind legs are pulled out and the antennae emerge last. The Banks Peninsula tree weta goes into a period of inactivity for a few days before moulting and lightens in colour. After moulting the weta consumes its exuviae, the shed skin, as this is made up of valuable proteins.

Adults live for several months and in some cases up to a year.

Diet, prey, and predators

Diet and foraging 
The Banks peninsula tree weta in an omnivore that feeds off of trees, shrubs, and in some cases pasture species. They are nocturnal and only come out at night to eat leaves and small insects. Due to their nocturnal nature they are preyed on by vertebrate predators such as rats.

Predators, parasites and diseases 
The main mammalian predators for Hemiedina ricta are rodents, specifically rats and possums, which are pests throughout mainland New Zealand and some offshore islands. Native diurnal birds such as kaka, weka and nocturnal birds such as kiwis and owls prey on weta as they are included in their food source. Other less common predators include tuatara and short-tailed bats.

Weta in some cases can be pest ridden with mites that will attach to the membranes of their joints.

Notes

References 

Weta
Banks Peninsula
Insects described in 1896
Anostostomatidae